Hadım Sinan Pasha (a, ; ; died 22 January 1517) was Bosnian-Ottoman nobleman, politician and statesman. He served as the Grand Vizier of the Ottoman Empire from 1516 to 1517. He  was a eunuch.

Life

Early life
Sinan Pasha was of Bosnian descent. According to Ragusan documents the Borovinić noble family were from the Borovinići village near Foča. His ancestor Tvrtko Borovinić (fl. 1417–46) was a close relative of Grand Dukes of Bosnia, Radoslav Pavlović, whom he served as a vassal.

Sanjak-bey
From December 1496 he was sanjak-bey of Bosnia. From 1504 to 1506, he was the sanjak-bey of Herzegovina. In 1507–08 he expanded the Mostar mosque built in 1473 by an earlier Sinan Pasha who was the first sanjak-bey of Herzegovina. Then he was the sanjak-bey of Smederevo between 1506 and 1513. Hadim Sinan was a eunuch.

Beylerbey and Grand Vizier
In 1514, he was the Beylerbey (high governor) of Anatolia. In the Battle of Chaldiran against Safavid Iran he was in charge of the right flank. After the battle he was appointed as the beylerbey of Rumelia, a post more prestigious than his former post. His next mission was the conquest of the Dulkadirids, a vassal of the Mamluk Sultanate, in what is now South Turkey. He defeated Bozkurt of Dulkadir in the Battle of Turnadağ. After the conquest of the beylik, Selim I (the Inflexible) appointed him as the grand vizier on April 25, 1516. Sinan was Selim's favorite grand vizier. He was active in the conquest of Syria and Egypt provinces of the Mamluk Sultanate. He defeated and subdued the independent Kurdish emirate of Baban, making them an Ottoman vassal. On October 28, 1516, he defeated an Egyptian Mamluk army in Khan Yunis, near Gaza, Palestine. Next year, he fought in the Battle of Ridaniya in Egypt on January 22, 1517. In Ottoman battle tradition, the sultan was almost always in the central headquarters. But the Battle of Ridaniya was an exception. Selim I decided to encircle the Mamluks personally and assigned Sinan in the central headquarters. The plot was successful and the Mamluks were defeated. However, before the battle was over, Mamluk cavalry (including Tuman bay II, the Egyptian sultan) raided the Ottoman headquarters and killed Sinan, thinking he was the sultan. After the battle, Sultan Selim expressed his sorrow, saying, "We won the battle, but we lost Sinan."

Personal life
According to some sources, Sinan was married to the full-sister of Sultan Bayezid II. It has been speculated that this sister was Gevherhan Hatun, Bayezid's only known full sister. Some historians have disputed this, arguing that Sinan may also have married one of Bayezid's half-sisters, or that Bayezid had an unknown second full-sister.

See also
List of Ottoman Grand Viziers

References

16th-century Grand Viziers of the Ottoman Empire
Grand Viziers of Selim I
Ottoman governors of Anatolia
Ottoman governors of Rumelia
Ottoman governors of Bosnia
Sanjak of Herzegovina
Year of birth unknown
1517 deaths
Eunuchs from the Ottoman Empire
Ottoman military personnel killed in action
Pashas
Devshirme
Ottoman Bosnian nobility
People from the Ottoman Empire of Bosnian descent
Bosnian Muslims from the Ottoman Empire
Slavs from the Ottoman Empire
1510s in the Ottoman Empire
16th century in Bosnia and Herzegovina
Ottoman people of the Ottoman–Persian Wars